Hostovice is a village in the Pardubice Region of the Czech Republic, since 2006 a part of Pardubice municipality. It has roughly 240 inhabitants.

References

Villages in Pardubice District